Perpetual Burn is the first studio album by the American guitarist Jason Becker, released in 1988 through Shrapnel Records (United States) and Roadrunner Records (Europe). The album was released at around the same time as Dragon's Kiss, the first album by the fellow Cacophony guitarist Marty Friedman, who also co-produced and performed on Perpetual Burn. This is the only solo album Becker released before his diagnosis with ALS in 1989.

Track listing

Personnel
Musicians
Jason Becker – lead and rhythm guitars, bass guitar, keyboards, producer
Marty Friedman – additional guitar solos (tracks 5–7), co-producer
Atma Anur – drums

Production
Steve Fontano – co-producer, engineer, mixing
Joe Marquez – assistant engineer
George Horn – mastering at Fantasy Studios, Berkeley, California
Mike Varney – executive producer

References

External links
In Review: Jason Becker "Perpetual Burn" at Guitar Nine Records

Jason Becker albums
1988 debut albums
Shrapnel Records albums
Roadrunner Records albums
Albums produced by Mike Varney